MRMC may stand for:

 United States Army Medical Research and Materiel Command.
 Markov Reward Model Checker, a probabilistic model checking tool.
 MrMC, an open source for-profit media player software based on Kodi (formerly XBMC Media Center).